The Blue Swords  began as a senior international figure skating competition in East Germany. First time in 1984 the competition was organised only for junior skaters. The 1986 edition was held November 13–15 in  Karl-Marx-Stadt. Medals were awarded in the disciplines of men's singles, ladies' singles and pair skating.

Men

Ladies

Pairs

References
German Newspaper "Neues Deutschland" Archiv, 17.11.1986

Blue Swords
1986 in figure skating